Long Branch, Virginia may refer to:
Long Branch, Caroline County, Virginia, an unincorporated community in Caroline County
Long Branch, Fairfax County, Virginia, an unincorporated community in Fairfax County